Sorolopha liochlora is a moth of the family Tortricidae. It is found in Sumatra and Taiwan.

The anterior part of the forewings is bright moss green. A faint paler bluish-green band parts this green area with an area of pale grey. The hindwings are dark purplish fuscous, but the basal half is paler fuscous grey.

References

Moths described in 1914
Olethreutini
Moths of Asia